Byron Shutt (born October 26, 1955) is a Canadian former professional ice hockey player who played in the World Hockey Association (WHA). Drafted in the ninth round of the 1975 NHL Amateur Draft by the Pittsburgh Penguins, Shutt opted to play in the WHA after being selected by the Toronto Toros in the seventh round of the 1975 WHA Amateur Draft. He played for the Cincinnati Stingers during the 1978–79 WHA season.  He is the younger brother of Hockey Hall of Famer Steve Shutt.

As a youth, he played in the 1968 Quebec International Pee-Wee Hockey Tournament with the Toronto Shopsy's minor ice hockey team. Shutt played junior ice hockey with the North York Rangers, before attending Bowling Green State University for four years. Drafted in 1975 by teams in the NHL and WHA, Shutt decided instead to remain at Bowling Green. In 1978, Shutt signed as a free agent with the Cincinnati Stingers, playing one season with the team and its affiliate Springfield Indians of the American Hockey League. The following season, the WHA folded and his rights were claimed by the Hartford Whalers in the WHA dispersal draft. The Whalers took over the affiliation with the Indians and formed a Cincinnati Stingers team in the Central Hockey League, and Shutt played for both teams in the 1979–80 season. In 1980, Shutt joined the Flint Generals of the International Hockey League (IHL), where he racked up 235 penalty minutes. Shutt played one more season of professional hockey in 1982–83 with the Saginaw Gears of the IHL before retiring.

After retiring from hockey, Shutt operated a landscaping firm and coached hockey for Bay High School in Ohio.

Career statistics

Awards and honours

1976–77 CCHA All-Star Honorable Mention

References

External links

1955 births
Living people
Bowling Green Falcons men's ice hockey players
Canadian ice hockey left wingers
Cincinnati Stingers players
Cincinnati Stingers (CHL) players
Flint Generals players
Ice hockey people from Toronto
Pittsburgh Penguins draft picks
Saginaw Gears players
Springfield Indians players
Toronto Toros draft picks